Imperia-Dynamo Penza is a Russian rugby club from Penza. They participate in the Professional Rugby League, the top division of Russian rugby.

History

Championships
 Russian Champions : Nil

Current squad 

 
 
 
 
 
 

 

 
 
 

Official Website (In Russian)

Russian rugby union teams
Professional Rugby League teams